Pyrus communis, the common pear, is a species of pear native to central and eastern Europe, and western Asia.

It is one of the most important fruits of temperate regions, being the species from which most orchard pear cultivars grown in Europe, North America, and Australia have been developed. Two other species of pear, the Nashi pear (Pyrus pyrifolia) and the hybrid Chinese white or ya pear (Pyrus × bretschneideri) are more widely grown in East Asia.

Subtaxa
The following subspecies are currently accepted:
Pyrus communis subsp. caucasica  – Turkey, Caucasus
Pyrus communis subsp. communis – Entire range except Caucasus

Origin
The cultivated Common pear (P. communis subsp. communis) is thought to be descended from two subspecies of wild pears, categorized as P. communis subsp. pyraster (syn. P. pyraster) and P. communis subsp. caucasica (syn. P. caucasica), which are interfertile with domesticated pears. Archeological evidence shows these pears "were collected from the wild long before their introduction into cultivation", according to Zohary and Hopf. Although they point to finds of pears in sites in Neolithic and Bronze Age European sites, "reliable information on pear cultivation first appears in the works of the Greek and the Roman writers." Theophrastus, Cato the Elder, and Pliny the Elder all present information about the cultivation and grafting of pears.

Cultivation

Common pear trees are not quite as hardy as apples, but nearly so. However, they do require some winter chilling to produce fruit. A number of Lepidoptera caterpillars feed on pear tree leaves.

For best and most consistent quality, common pears are picked when the fruit matures, but before they are ripe. Fruit allowed to ripen on the tree often drops before it can be picked, and in any event will be hard to pick without bruising. Pears store (and ship) well in their mature but unripe state if kept cold, and can be ripened later, a process called bletting. Some varieties, such as Beurre d'Anjou, ripen only with exposure to cold.

Fermented pear juice is called perry. In Britain, the place name "Perry" can indicate the historical presence of pear trees.

Relatively few cultivars of European or Asian pears are widely grown worldwide. Only about 20–25 European and 10–20 Asian cultivars represent virtually all the pears of commerce. Almost all European cultivars were chance seedlings or selections originating in western Europe, mostly France. The Asian cultivars all originated in Japan and China. 'Bartlett' (Williams) is the most common pear cultivar in the world, representing about 75% of US pear production.

Major cultivars

In the United States, 95% of reported pear production in 2004 came from four cultivars:
50% Williams' Bon Chrétien (England, circa 1770; a summer pear commonly called Bartlett in the US and Canada, and Williams elsewhere)
34% Beurré d'Anjou (France, a winter pear commonly called just d'Anjou)
10% Beurré Bosc (France, also known as Kaiser Alexander, a winter pear commonly called just Bosc or Kaiser)
1% Doyenné du Comice (France, 1849; commonly called Comice pears)

Selected common pear cultivars
Those marked  have gained the Royal Horticultural Society's Award of Garden Merit.

'Abate Fetel' (syn. Abbé Fetel; a major cultivar in Italy)
'Ayers' (USA - an interspecific P. communis × P. pyrifolia hybrid from the University of Tennessee)
'Bambinella' (Malta)
'Beth' 
Beurré Hardy/Gellerts Butterbirne
'Blake's Pride' (USA)
'Blanquilla' (or 'pera de agua' and 'blanquilla de Aranjuez', Spain)
'Butirra Precoce Morettini'
'Carmen'
'Clara Frijs' (major cultivar in Denmark)
'Concorde' (England - a seedling of 'Conference' × 'Doyenné du Comice) 
'Conference' (England, 1894; the most popular commercial variety in the UK) 
'Corella' (Australia)
'Coscia' (very early maturing cultivar from Italy)
'Don Guindo' (Spain - strong yellow, flavoured taste)
'Doyenné du Comice' (France)
'Dr. Jules Guyot'
'Forelle' (Germany)
'Glou Morceau' (Belgium, 1750)
'Gorham' (USA)
'Gracioen' (Belgium)
'Harrow Delight' (Canada)
'Harrow Sweet' (Canada)
'Joséphine de Malines' (Belgium - obtained by Esperen, pomologist and mayor of Malines in the 19th century; one of the best late season pears) 
'Kieffer' (USA - a hybrid of the Chinese "sand pear", P. pyrifolia and probably 'Bartlett')
'Laxton's Superb' (England; no longer used due to high susceptibility to fireblight)
'Louise Bonne of Jersey' 
'Luscious' (USA)
'Merton Pride' (England, 1941)
'Onward' (UK) 
'Orient' (USA - an interspecific P. communis × P. pyrifolia hybrid)
'Packham's Triumph' (Australia, 1896)
'Pineapple' (USA - an interspecific P. communis × P. pyrifolia hybrid)
'Red Bartlett' (USA - There are three major red-skinned mutant clones: 'Max Red Bartlett', 'Sensation Red Bartlett', 'Rosired Bartlett')
'Rocha' (Portugal)
'Rosemarie' (South Africa)
'Seckel' (USA; late 17th century Philadelphia area; still produced, naturally resistant to fireblight)
'Starkrimson', also called Red Clapp's, is a red-skinned 1939 Michigan bud mutation of Clapp's Favourite. Its thick, smooth skin is a uniform, bright and intense red, and its creamy flesh is sweet and aromatic.
'Summer Beauty'
'Sudduth'
'Taylor's Gold' (New Zealand - a russeted mutant clone of 'Comice')
Triomphe de Vienne
'Williams Bonne Chrétienne'

Gallery

References

External links

Pyrus communis images at bioimages.vanderbilt.edu

Flora of Central Europe
Flora of Eastern Europe
Flora of Western Asia
Pears
Plants described in 1753
Taxa named by Carl Linnaeus
communis
Fruit trees